Recording King is a  musical instruments brand currently owned by The Music Link Corporation, based in Hayward, California, which also produces other musical instrument lines.

Range of products commercialised under the Recording King brand are acoustic and resonator guitars, and banjos. Their guitars are designed in America, manufactured overseas and sold worldwide.

Brand history 
Recording King started as a house brand for Montgomery Ward in the 1930s. Legendary guitarist John Fahey played a 1939 model.
The original guitar was similar to the Gibson Advanced Jumbo, discontinued in 1939.
The brand was revived in 2007 by The Music Link in Hayward, CA.  Current Recording King products use vintage designs and replicas of pre-World War II parts.

Musicians
Musicians who use Recording King guitars include Christian Letts of Edward Sharpe and the Magnetic Zeros, Justin Townes Earle, John Fahey, Mark Spencer of Son Volt, Will Kimbrough, Lizzy Long, Caitlin Canty, Elvis Presley, Jonathan Devoto of The Matches, Rabbi Sandra Lawson, Rob McCoury and Buster Scruggs.

References

External links
 

Musical instruments brands
Guitar manufacturing companies of the United States
Banjo manufacturing companies
Companies based in Hayward, California
Music of the San Francisco Bay Area